John Graham Blackburn (2 September 1933 – 12 October 1994) was a Conservative Member of Parliament in the United Kingdom.  He represented the constituency of Dudley West from 1979 until his death in 1994.

Blackburn attended school in Liverpool and studied at the University of Liverpool.  From 1954 until 1963 he served as a police officer.  He also served as a councillor in Wolverhampton.  He was elected to the House of Commons at the 1979 general election, with a majority of 1139, gaining the seat from Labour and subsequently held the seat at the 1983, 1987 and 1992 elections.

In 1982, Blackburn unsuccessfully argued in the House of Commons for the retention of the Round Oak Steelworks in Brierley Hill, which closed in December of that year with the loss of nearly 1,300 jobs and was later redeveloped for the Waterfront leisure and commercial complex.

Blackburn died in office of a heart attack in October 1994, aged 61. Following his death, a by-election was held, which was won by Labour's Ian Pearson on the biggest swing since the Second World War, winning nearly 70% of the vote. Following boundary changes, Pearson then became Labour MP for the new Dudley South constituency after the 1997 election.

References 

Times Guide to the House of Commons, 1992 and 1997 editions

1933 births
1994 deaths
Alumni of the University of Liverpool
British police officers
Conservative Party (UK) MPs for English constituencies
Councillors in Wolverhampton
People from Dudley
People from Wolverhampton
UK MPs 1979–1983
UK MPs 1983–1987
UK MPs 1987–1992
UK MPs 1992–1997